Heikant is a hamlet in the municipality of Hilvarenbeek, in the Dutch province of North Brabant. It is located about 5 km south of Diessen.

References

Populated places in North Brabant
Hilvarenbeek